3form Free Knowledge Exchange is one of the earliest examples of human-based computation and human-based genetic algorithm.  It uses both human-based selection and three types of human-based innovation (contributing new content, mutation, and recombination), in order to implement collaborative problem-solving between humans.

See also
 LinkedIn Answers
 Human-based Genetic Algorithm

References

 The Kaieteur Institute for Knowledge Management (2001), Categories of digital knowledge exchanges online
 Kosorukoff, A (2001), Human-based Genetic Algorithm. IEEE Transactions on Systems, Man, and Cybernetics, SMC-2001, 3464-3469
 Hideyuki Takagi (2001), Interactive Evolutionary Computation: Fusion of the Capabilities of EC Optimization and Human Evaluation, Proceedings of the IEEE, vol.89, no. 9, pp. 1275–1296
 Kosorukoff, A. & Goldberg, D. E. (2001) Genetic algorithms for social innovation and creativity (Illigal report No 2001005). Urbana, IL: University of Illinois at Urbana-Champaign online
 Kosorukoff, A, Goldberg D. E. (2002), Genetic algorithm as a form of organization, Proceedings of Genetic and Evolutionary Computation Conference, GECCO-2002, pp 965–972
 Ajwani, D et al. (Eds) Fast Track to The Social Web, Digit magazine, August 2007 p. 116 online
 Gloor, P et al. (2008) MIT Handbook of collective intelligence, Examples of collective intelligence online
 Javadi, E.; Gebauer, J. "Collaborative Knowledge Creation and Problem Solving: A Systems Design Perspective," System Sciences, 2009. HICSS '09. 42nd Hawaii International Conference on, vol., no., pp. 1–10, 5-8 Jan. 2009 doi: 10.1109/HICSS.2009.111

External links
 3form website

Knowledge markets
Human-based computation